Herennia is a genus of spiders in the family Araneidae, found from India to northern Australia. It was formerly placed in a separate family, Nephilidae. While two species have been known since the 19th century, nine new species were described in 2005. Spiders in this genus are sometimes called coin spiders.

While H. multipuncta is invasive and synanthropic, all other known species are endemic to islands.

Like in the related genus Nephilengys, the much smaller males mutilate and sever their pedipalps, which are often found stuck in the epigynum or female genital openings. It is suggested that they act as mating plugs to prevent other males from mating with the female and thereby ensure the paternity of offspring. The males cannot mate subsequently and such "eunuch" individuals continue to stay near the female.

Name
Herennia Etruscilla was the wife of Trajan Decius. There are coins bearing her image, which were probably the source for Thorell to name the genus. The non-scientific name coin spiders was proposed because of this fact.

Species

, the World Spider Catalog accepted the following species:

 Herennia agnarssoni Kuntner, 2005 — Solomon Islands
 Herennia deelemanae Kuntner, 2005 — Borneo
 Herennia etruscilla Kuntner, 2005 — Java
 Herennia gagamba Kuntner, 2005 — Philippines
 Herennia jernej Kuntner, 2005 — Sumatra
 Herennia milleri Kuntner, 2005 — New Guinea, New Britain
 Herennia multipuncta (Doleschall, 1859) — India to China, Borneo, Sulawesi
 Herennia oz Kuntner, 2005 — Northern Territory
 Herennia papuana Thorell, 1881 — New Guinea
 Herennia sonja Kuntner, 2005 — Kalimantan, Sulawesi
 Herennia tone Kuntner, 2005 — Philippines

References

Araneidae
Araneomorphae genera
Spiders of Asia
Spiders of Oceania